John of Antioch, also known as Harent of Antioch, was a 13th-century Old French writer of Outremer who made important translations from Latin. He translated Cicero, Boethius, the Otia imperialia and possibly the rule of the Knights Hospitaller. His original writing consists of an epilogue to Cicero and some additional chapters appended to the Otia.

Life
John was born in Antioch to a family of western European origin. There is no evidence that he ever attended university. He lived in Antioch before its conquest by the Mamlūks in 1268, after which he moved to Acre. He was attached to the Knights Hospitaller, probably as a priest at the main hospital in Acre. Some Italianisms in his translations suggest that his first language was Italian rather than French.

Works
At the request of fellow Hospitaller William of Santo Stefano, John translated Cicero's De inventione and the anonymous Rhetorica ad Herennium. At the time these works were considered two parts of a singular work of Cicero's on rhetoric. John's translation thus came under the title Rectorique de Marc Tulles Cyceron. It was completed at Acre in 1282. The manuscript presented to William—now Chantilly, Musée Condé, MS fr. 433 (590)—also contains a preface, an epilogue on the methodology of translation and a treatise on logic. These parts may also have been completed at Acre in 1282 or perhaps a little later in Cyprus. The preface and the treatise on logic are in a different hand from the rest of the manuscript, which is probably in John's hand. The epilogue was written by John (and thus probably at Acre in 1282). The treatise on logic consists of excerpts from Boethius' De topicis differentiis, most likely translated but probably not selected by John.

John also translated Gervase of Tilbury's Otia imperialia from Latin into Old French. This translation, now in Paris, Bibliothèque nationale de France, MS fr. 9113, is ascribed to "maystre Harent d'Antioche". Although doubt has been cast on the identity of this person with John, the Chantilly manuscript refers to the translator of the Rectorique as "Johan d’Anthioche, que l'en apele de Harens" ("who is called Harent") and there is no reason to doubt that they are one and the same. To Gervase's Otia he added five chapters of original material in Old French. In these he provides some of the best evidence that he was a man of the church, including several accounts of miracles. Gaston Paris placed the production of the translation of the Otia at Acre before 1287, and in one place precisely in 1285, but it is not certain it was made at Acre.

The influence of Brunetto Latini's Livres dou trésor is apparent in John's addenda to the Otia. These five additional chapters rely heavily on chapters 82–98 of the first book of Brunetto's Trésor as completed after 1266. These contain references to Emperor Frederick II and King Manfred of Sicily, and permit John to extend Gervase's list of rulers of the Holy Roman Empire down to his own time.

John may also be behind the Old French translation of the Hospitaller rule and of certain documents from the Hospitaller archives in Acre initiated by William of Santo Stefano and undertaken between 1278 and 1283.

Methodology
John's translations were pioneering. Only about ten Old French translations of classical writers are known down to John's time. His Rectorique may be among the two or three earliest true translations, rather than adaptations, from Latin into Old French. It was the first such translation on rhetoric other than a few passages of Brunetto Latini's Trésor. The translation of De topicis differentiis is "one of the first vernacular [European] texts in logic". The significance of this translation lies in the fact that leading contemporary opinion, as expressed by no less than Roger Bacon, was that logic could not be adequately expressed in vernacular languages. Indeed, John had to create new words to translate Boethius, such as entimeme for enthymeme, a word not otherwise attested in medieval French.

In his epilogue on translation, John describes the difference between translating by word and by sense:
... the manner of speaking in Latin is not generally the same as that of French. Neither the properties of words nor the methods of arranging arguments and words in Latin are the same as those of French. And that is [so] generally in every language. Because every language has its own properties and its manner of speaking. ... For that reason it was useful for the translator of this science to translate sometimes word for word, and sometimes and more frequently sentence for sentence, and sometimes because of the great obscurity of a sentence to add to it and lengthen it.
Although the ad verbum (by word) and ad sensum (by sense) distinction was ancient, John's phrase maniere de parler (manner of speaking) has an exact equivalent in Philip of Tripoli's prologue to his translation of the Arabic Secret of Secrets into Latin, which was made in Outremer and where Philip speaks of the differing loquendi modus (way of speaking) between Arabic and Latin. Some of John's emendations that appear in the Rectorique suggest the influence of Donatus.

Notes

References

Bibliography

People from Antioch
13th-century Roman Catholic priests
13th-century French writers
13th-century translators
Latin–French translators
People of the Crusader states
Knights Hospitaller